{{Infobox television
| image        = Manam Pole Mangalyam.jpg
| writer       = Shekhar Dhavalikar
| director     = A.M.Nazeer
| editor       = Ajith Raj
| starring     = 
| language     = Malayalam
| country      = India
| first_aired  = 
| last_aired   = 
| producer     = Sudeep Karakkat and Arun Devassia
| runtime      = 22 minutes
| network      = Zee Keralam
| camera       = Multi-camera
| num_seasons  = 1
| num_episodes = 260
| composer     = Ranjin Raj Sithara Krishnakumar
| opentheme    = 'Kaatte Kaatte}}

Manam Pole Mangalyam  is a Malayalam language television series airing on Zee Keralam and streams on Zee5. It stars Niyaz Musliyar, Meera Nair, Swasika, Rajendran N and Prem Jacob. It premiered on 28 December 2020. It is an official remake of Zee Marathi series Aggabai Sasubai'' aired from 2019 to 2021.

Plot outline 
Meera is a widow, she takes care of her family and faces all life issues calmly. She raised her son "Nikhil" and also takes care of her father-in-law but she always pays less attention to herself while loving everyone else except herself. After the marriage of Nikhil, the show focuses on how Meera's daughter in law "Nila" strives to bring a little joy in Meera's life. After the marriage of Nikhil and Nila, the family celebrates their marriage party in Arvind Raj's restaurant. The chef, Arvind Raj notices Meera and falls in love with her and the story begins.

Cast

Main Cast
 Niyas Musliar as Aravind Raja 
A popular chef and owner of Raja's kitchen
Meera's second husband
 Meera Nair as Meera
A widow, dedicated house wife and kind hearted women. She is Unnithan's daughter-in-law; Nikhil's mother and Nila's mother-in-law.
 Swasika as Nila Nikhil 
A bold and straight forward girl. She is Nikhil's lover and turns wife; Meera's daughter-in-law; Unnithan's grand daughter-in-law.
 Rajendran N as Radhakrishnan Unnithan
 Sreekanth Sasidharan (Episode 1–100) / Prem Jacob (Episode 100 – present) as Nikhil Mukundan
Unnithan's grandson, Mukundan and Meera's son and Nila's husband

Recurring Cast
 Boban Alummoodan as Mukundhan/Babuji
 Unnithan's son and Nikhil's father
 Ann Maria as Sona
 Babuji's caretaker
 Jolly Easow as Clara; Meera's neighbor
 Rahul Mohan as Ravishankar; Nila's father
 Kishore as Dr.Nambeesan
 Sayana Krishna as Vimala; Cunning and jealous lady in Meera's neighborhood
 Sunitha as Latha; Vimala's mother in law
 Hari as Udayan; Vimala's husband
 Adya Aurora as Medha
 Jayan as Mahadevan; Unnithan's younger brother
 Lakshmi Sanal as Sreedevi Thankachi; Mahadevan's wife
 Bindhu Aneesh as Hemalatha; Nila's mother
 Riya as Julie; Nikhil's boss and Aravind Raja's friend
 M. R. Gopakumar as Retd.Captain Rajaraja Varma/Varmaji
 Anil Narayanan as Gopi; Vimala's father in law
 Vandana Krishnan as Mili; Raja's personal assistant
 Della George as Thinkal Mariyam 
 Sumi Santhosh

Cameo Appearance
Mridula Vijay as Samyuktha 
Nila's friend (in Nila-Nikhil Wedding Episode)
Sushmitha Prabhakaran as Sreelakshmi
Nila's friend (in Meera's Haldi Episode)
Prayaga Martin as herself (guest in Meera-Aravind Raja Marriage Maha episode)
Meghna Vincent as Jyothi (promo presence)
Amala Gireesan as Kalyani  (promo presence)
Shanavas Shanu as Hitler  (promo presence)

Production 
The production team involves Sudeep Karakkat Arun Devassia and Umesh Unnikrishnan (Umesh Nair).

Music
The title song been composed by Ranjin Raj and sung by Sithara Krishnakumar and B.K.Harinarayanan.

Casting
Swasika plays the role of Nila, the daughter-in-law. This marks her comeback to Malayalam Television after 2 years. Actor Niyas Musliar also plays the lead role of Arvind Raj. Meera Nair who made her debut in Njan Prakashan plays the character of Meera, the progressive mother-in-law. Newcomer Srikanth plays Meera's conservative son Nikhil.

Adaptations

References

External links 

 Manam Pole Mangalyam at ZEE5
 

Zee Keralam original programming
Malayalam-language television shows
2020 Indian television series debuts
2022 Indian television series endings